Ananya Vajpeyi is an Indian academic and writer. She is Fellow at the Centre for the Study of Developing Societies. She is the author of the award-winning book "Righteous Republic: The Political foundations of Modern India" published by the Harvard University Press.  Born in 1972.

Life and career 
Vajpeyi is the daughter of Sahitya Akademi award-winning poet Kailash Vajpeyi.

Vajpeyi received her MA at the Jawaharlal Nehru University, M.Phil. from the University of Oxford as a Rhodes Scholar, and Ph.D. at the University of Chicago. She has taught at the University of Massachusetts and Columbia University

Works 
Her book "Righteous Republic" won the Crossword Award for Non-Fiction (2013), jointly with "From the Ruins of Empire" by Pankaj Mishra. It also won the Thomas J Wilson Memorial Prize from Harvard University Press and the Tata First Book Award for Non-Fiction (2013). It was also featured on the Books of the year 2012 list on The Guardian and The New Republic.

She is the co-editor with Ramin Jahanbegloo of Ashis Nandy: A Life in Dissent (OUP, 2018) and with Volker Kaul of Minorities and Populism: Critical Perspectives from South Asia and Europe (Springer, 2020).

She writes regularly for The Hindu newspaper and Scroll.in. She has conceived, commissioned and guest edited several issues of Seminar magazine.

See also 
 Sheldon Pollock
 B. R. Ambedkar
 Hindutva

References

External links
 Official website at Centre for the Study of Developing Societies

Indian women political writers
Jawaharlal Nehru University alumni
Alumni of the University of Oxford
University of Chicago alumni
University of Massachusetts faculty
Columbia University faculty
Year of birth missing (living people)
Living people
Indian political writers
21st-century Indian women writers
21st-century Indian writers
21st-century Indian non-fiction writers